Badecla is a Neotropical genus  in the family Lycaenidae.

Species
Badecla argentinensis 
Badecla badaca (Hewitson, 1868)
Badecla clarissa 
Badecla lanckena 
Badecla picentia (Hewitson, 1868)
Badecla quadramacula (G.T. Austin & K. Johnson, 1997)

References

  2010: Description and phylogenetic analysis of the Calycopidina (Lepidoptera, Lycaenidae, Theclinae, Eumaeini): a subtribe of detritivores. Revista Brasileira de Entomologia 54 (1): 45–64. Full article: .
 , 1993: Elfin butterflies from the Adams/Bernard expeditions to Colombia and Venezuela (Lepidoptera: Lycaenidae: Theclinae). Reports of the Museum of Natural History, University of Wisconsin (Stevens Point) 25: 1–10.

Lycaenidae of South America
Eumaeini
Butterfly genera